The Kingdom of Italy ( or Regnum Italicum;), also called Imperial Italy, was one of the constituent kingdoms of the Holy Roman Empire, along with the kingdoms of Germany, Bohemia, and Burgundy. It originally comprised large parts of northern and central Italy. Its original capital was Pavia until the 11th century.

In 773, Charlemagne, the king of the Franks, crossed the Alps to invade the Kingdom of the Lombards, which encompassed all of Italy except the Duchy of Rome, the Venetian Republic and the Byzantine possessions in the south. In June 774, the kingdom collapsed and the Franks became masters of northern Italy. The southern areas remained under Lombard control, as the Duchy of Benevento was changed into the rather independent Principality of Benevento. Charlemagne called himself king of the Lombards and in 800 was crowned emperor in Rome. Members of the Carolingian dynasty continued to rule Italy until the deposition of Charles the Fat in 887, after which they once briefly regained the throne in 894–896. Until 961, the rule of Italy was continually contested by several aristocratic families from both within and outside the kingdom.

In 961, King Otto I of Germany, already married to Queen Adelaide of Italy, invaded the kingdom and had himself crowned in Pavia on 25 December. He continued on to Rome, where he had himself crowned emperor on 7 February 962. The union of the crowns of Italy and Germany with that of the so-called "Empire of the Romans" proved stable. Burgundy was added to this union in 1032, and by the twelfth century the term "Holy Roman Empire" had come into use to describe it. From 961 on, the emperor was usually also king of Italy and Germany, although emperors sometimes appointed their heirs to rule in Italy and occasionally the Italian bishops and noblemen elected a king of their own in opposition to that of Germany. The absenteeism of the Italian monarch led to the rapid disappearance of a central government in the High Middle Ages, but the idea that Italy was a kingdom within the Empire remained and emperors frequently sought to impose their will on the evolving Italian city-states. The resulting wars between Guelphs and Ghibellines, the anti-imperialist and imperialist factions, respectively, were characteristic of Italian politics in the 12th–14th centuries. The Lombard League was the most famous example of this situation; though not a declared separatist movement, it openly challenged the emperor's claim to power.

The century between the Humiliation of Canossa (1077) and the Treaty of Venice of 1177 resulted in the formation of city states independent of the Germanic emperor. A series of wars in Lombardy from 1423 to 1454 reduced the number of competing states in Italy. The next forty years were relatively peaceful in Italy, but in 1494 the peninsula was invaded by France.

After the Imperial Reform of 1495–1512, the Italian kingdom corresponded to the unencircled territories south of the Alps. Juridically the emperor maintained an interest in them as nominal king and overlord, but the "government" of the kingdom consisted of little more than the plenipotentiaries the emperor appointed to represent him and those governors he appointed to rule his own Italian states.

The Habsburg rule in several parts of Italy continued in various forms but came to an end with the campaigns of the French Revolutionaries in 1792–1797, when a series of sister republics were set up with local support by Napoleon and then united into the Italian Republic under his presidency. In 1805 the Republic became a new Kingdom of Italy, in personal union with France.

Lombard kingdom

After the Battle of Taginae, in which the Ostrogoth king Totila was killed, the Byzantine general Narses captured Rome and besieged Cumae. Teia, the new Ostrogothic king, gathered the remnants of the Ostrogothic army and marched to relieve the siege, but in October 552 Narses ambushed him at Mons Lactarius (modern Monti Lattari) in Campania, near Mount Vesuvius and Nuceria Alfaterna. The battle lasted two days and Teia was killed in the fighting. Ostrogothic power in Italy was eliminated, but according to Roman historian Procopius of Caesarea, Narses allowed the Ostrogothic population and their Rugian allies to live peacefully in Italy under Roman sovereignty. The absence of any real authority in Italy immediately after the battle led to an invasion by the Franks and Alemanni, but they too were defeated in the battle of the Volturnus and the peninsula was, for a short time, reintegrated into the empire.

The Kings of the Lombards (singular ) ruled those Germanic people from their invasion of Italy in 567–68 until the Lombardic identity became lost in the ninth and tenth centuries. After 568, the Lombard kings sometimes styled themselves Kings of Italy. Upon the Lombard defeat at the 774 Siege of Pavia, the kingdom came under the Frankish domination of Charlemagne. The Iron Crown of Lombardy (Corona Ferrea) was used for the coronation of the Lombard kings, and the kings of Italy thereafter, for centuries.

The primary sources for the Lombard kings before the Frankish conquest are the anonymous 7th-century Origo Gentis Langobardorum and the 8th-century Historia Langobardorum of Paul the Deacon. The earliest kings (the pre-Lethings) listed in the Origo are almost certainly legendary. They purportedly reigned during the Migration Period; the first ruler attested independently of Lombard tradition is Tato.

The actual control of the sovereigns of both the major areas that constitute the kingdom – Langobardia Major in the centre-north (in turn divided into a western, or Neustria, and one eastern, or Austria and Tuskia) and Langobardia Minor in the centre-south, was not constant during the two centuries of life of the kingdom. An initial phase of strong autonomy of the many constituent duchies developed over time with growing regal authority, even if the dukes' desires for autonomy were never fully achieved.

The Lombard kingdom proved to be more stable than its Ostrogothic predecessor, but in 774, on the pretext of defending the Papacy, it was conquered by the Franks under Charlemagne. They kept the Italo-Lombard realm separate from their own, but the kingdom shared in all the partitions, divisions, civil wars, and succession crises of the Carolingian Empire of which it became a part until, by the end of the ninth century, the Italian kingdom was an independent, but highly decentralised, state.

Constituent of the Carolingian Empire
The death of the Emperor Lothair I in 855 led to his realm of Middle Francia being split among his three sons.  The eldest, Louis II, inherited the Carolingian lands in Italy, which were now for the first time (save the brief rule of Charlemagne's son Pepin in the first decade of the century), ruled as a distinct unit. The kingdom included all of Italy as far south as Rome and Spoleto, but the rest of Italy to the south was under the rule of the Lombard Principality of Benevento or of the Byzantine Empire.

Following Louis II's death without heirs, there were several decades of confusion. The Imperial crown was initially disputed among the Carolingian rulers of West Francia (France) and East Francia (Germany), with first the western king (Charles the Bald) and then the eastern (Charles the Fat) attaining the prize. Following the deposition of the latter, local nobles – Guy III of Spoleto and Berengar of Friuli – disputed over the crown, and outside intervention did not cease, with Arnulf of Eastern Francia and Louis the Blind of Provence both claiming the Imperial throne for a time. The kingdom was also beset by Arab raiding parties from Sicily and North Africa, and central authority was minimal at best.

In the 10th century, the situation hardly improved, as various Burgundian and local noblemen continued to dispute over the crown. Order was only imposed from outside, when the German king Otto I invaded Italy and seized both the Imperial and Italian thrones for himself in 962.

Imperial Italy
In 951, King Otto I of Germany married Adelaide of Burgundy, the widow of late King Lothair II of Italy. Otto assumed the Iron Crown of Lombardy at Pavia despite his rival Margrave Berengar of Ivrea. When in 960 Berengar attacked the Papal States, King Otto, summoned by Pope John XII, conquered the Italian kingdom and on 2 February 962 had himself crowned Holy Roman Emperor at Rome. From that time on, the Kings of Italy were always also Kings of Germany, and Italy thus became a constituent kingdom of the Holy Roman Empire, along with the Kingdom of Germany (regnum Teutonicorum) and – from 1032 – Burgundy. The German king (Rex Romanorum) would be crowned by the Archbishop of Milan with the Iron Crown in Pavia as a prelude to the visit to Rome to be crowned Emperor by the Pope.

In general, the monarch was an absentee, spending most of his time in Germany and leaving the Kingdom of Italy with little central authority. There was also a lack of powerful landed magnates – the only notable one being the Margraviate of Tuscany, which had wide lands in Tuscany, Lombardy, and the Emilia, but which failed due to lack of heirs after the death of Matilda of Canossa in 1115. This left a power vacuum – increasingly filled by the Papacy and by the bishops, as well as by the increasingly wealthy Italian cities, which gradually came to dominate the surrounding countryside. Upon the death of Emperor Otto III in 1002, one of late Berengar's successors, Margrave Arduin of Ivrea, even succeeded in assuming the Italian crown and in defeating the Imperial forces under Duke Otto I of Carinthia. Not until 1004 could the new German King Henry II of Germany, by the aid of Bishop Leo of Vercelli, move into Italy to have himself crowned rex Italiae. Arduin ranks as the last domestic "King of Italy" before the accession of Victor Emmanuel II in 1861.

Henry's Salian successor Conrad II tried to confirm his dominion against Archbishop Aribert of Milan and other Italian aristocrats (seniores). While besieging Milan in 1037, he issued the Constitutio de feudis in order to secure the support of the vasvassores petty gentry, whose fiefs he declared hereditary. Indeed, Conrad could stable his rule, however, the Imperial supremacy in Italy remained contested.

Staufer

The cities first demonstrated their increasing power during the reign of the Hohenstaufen Emperor Frederick Barbarossa (1152–1190), whose attempts to restore imperial authority in the peninsula led to a series of wars with the Lombard League, a league of northern Italian cities, most of the times headed by Milan, and ultimately to a decisive victory for the League at the Battle of Legnano in 1176, that had as its leader the Milanese Guido da Landriano, which forced Frederick to make administrative, political, and judicial concessions to the municipalities, officially ending his attempt to dominate Northern Italy. From then, Italy became a patchwork of autonomous duchies and city-states only nominally tied to the Holy Roman Empire.

Frederick's son Henry VI actually managed to extend Hohenstaufen authority in Italy by his conquest of the Norman Kingdom of Sicily, which comprised Sicily and all of Southern Italy. Henry's son, Frederick II, Holy Roman Emperor – the first emperor since the 10th century to actually base himself in Italy – attempted to return to his father's task of restoring imperial authority in the northern Italian Kingdom, which led to fierce opposition not only from a reformed Lombard League, but also from the Popes, who had become increasingly jealous of their temporal realm in central Italy (theoretically a part of the Empire), and concerned about the hegemonic ambitions of the Hohenstaufen emperors.

Frederick II's efforts to bring all of Italy under his control failed as signally as those of his grandfather, and his death in 1250 marked the effective end of the Kingdom of Italy as a genuine political unit. Conflict continued between Ghibellines (Imperial supporters) and Guelfs (Papal supporters) in the Italian cities, but these conflicts bore less and less relation to the origins of the parties in question.

Decline

The Italian campaigns of the Holy Roman Emperors decreased, but the Kingdom did not become wholly meaningless. In 1310 the Luxembourg King Henry VII of Germany with 5,000 men again crossed the Alps, moved into Milan and had himself crowned with the Iron Crown of Lombardy, sparking a Guelph rebellion under Lord Guido della Torre. Henry restored the rule of Matteo I Visconti and proceeded to Rome, where he was crowned Holy Roman Emperor by three cardinals in place of Pope Clement V in 1312. His further plans to restore the Imperial rule and to invade the Kingdom of Naples were aborted by his sudden death the next year.

Successive emperors in the 14th and 15th centuries were bound in the struggle between the rivaling Luxembourg, Habsburg and Wittelsbach dynasties. In the conflict with Frederick the Fair, King Louis IV (reigned until 1347) had himself crowned Emperor in Rome by Antipope Nicholas V in 1328. His successor Charles IV also returned to Rome to be crowned in 1355. None of the Emperors forgot their theoretical claims to dominion as Kings of Italy. Nor did the Italians themselves forget the claims of the Emperors to universal dominion: writers like Dante Alighieri (died 1321) and Marsilius of Padua (c. 1275 – c. 1342) expressed their commitment both to the principle of universal monarchy, and to the actual pretensions of Emperors Henry VII and Louis IV, respectively.

The Imperial claims to dominion in Italy mostly manifested themselves, however, in the granting of titles to the various strongmen who had begun to establish their control over the formerly republican cities. Most notably, the Emperors gave their backing to the Visconti of Milan, and King Wenceslaus created Gian Galeazzo Visconti Duke of Milan in 1395. Other families to receive new titles from the emperors were the Gonzaga of Mantua, and the Este of Ferrara and Modena.

Imperial fiefs in the modern period
By the beginning of the early modern period, the Kingdom in Italy still formally existed but had de facto splintered into completely independent and self-governing city states. Its territory had been significantly limited – the conquests of the Republic of Venice in the "domini di Terraferma" and those of the Papal States had taken most of northeastern and central Italy outside the jurisdiction of the Empire.

In many aspects, the Imperial claims to feudal overlordship over the Italian territories had become practically meaningless: the effective political authority, as well as the power to raise taxes and spend resources, was in the hands of the Italian princes and dukes. However, the presence of the Imperial feudal network in Italy continued to play a role in the history of the peninsula. It gave to the emperors Sigismund and Maximilian I the pretext to intervene in Italian affairs. Furthermore, the Imperial rights were notably asserted during the Italian Wars by Charles V, Holy Roman Emperor (also King of Spain and Naples, Archduke of Austria and Duke of Burgundy). He drove the French from Milan after the Battle of Pavia, and prevented an attempt by the Italian princes, with French aid, to reassert their independence in the League of Cognac. His mutinous troops sacked Rome and, coming to terms with the Medici pope Clement VII, conquered Florence where he reinstalled the Medici as Dukes of Florence after a siege. Charles V was crowned King of Italy with the Iron Crown in medieval fashion and, upon the extinction of the Sforza line of Milan in 1535, claimed direct possession of that territory as an Imperial fief. After Charles divided his possession between a Spanish and Austrian branch, Milan became a possession of the Spanish Empire of Charles's son Philip II of Spain, whereas the title of Holy Roman Emperor and the rights connected to Imperial Italy were transferred to Charles's brother, Ferdinand I. Milan continued to be a state of the Holy Roman Empire so that, in his position as Duke of Milan, Philip II was, at least formally, a vassal of Emperor Ferdinand. However, following the reign of Charles V, no Holy Roman Emperor of the Austrian Habsburgs was crowned King of Italy and the title effectively ceased to be used for two centuries and a half.

In 1559, the Kingdom of France ended its ambitions over the Imperial fiefs in Italy, abandoning its claims to Savoy and Milan and withdrawing from Tuscany and Genoese Corsica by the terms of the peace of Cateau-Cambrésis, and a special section of the Imperial Aulic Council in Vienna was established to deal with Italian affairs and legal appeals coming from the peninsula.  The major imperial fiefs in Italy were known as "Feuda latina", whereas the smaller ones were known as "Feuda Minora". Italian princes sometimes took part in Imperial diets and their forces also joined the Imperial army, as in the case of the Hungarian campaign of Maximilian II, Holy Roman Emperor against Suleyman the Magnificent in 1566.

While they were excluded from the Reichstag, the Italian states were still considered vassals of the emperor, like other states of the empire, and thus subject to certain obligations and jurisdiction. A special Italian section of the Reichshofrat was created in 1559. It handled 1,500 cases from Imperial Italy between 1559 and 1806 (out of 140,000 total), with most of those cases coming from later dates.Wilson 2016, p. 225. Italian states provided significant support in all of the Empire's wars in this time, either under their own princes or as part of the Habsburg territories (such as the Free Imperial City of Trieste, the County of Gorizia and Gradisca, the Duchy of Milan, and later the Grand Duchy of Tuscany). Unlike most of the German states, the Imperial Italian contributions bypassed the Reichstag and other institutions and went directly to the Imperial army and treasury. The Italian states were in large part autonomous, but their lack of representation gave the emperor greater ability to act autonomously with the Italian principalities than the German ones, such as when he decided to simply add the Grand Duchy of Tuscany (officially an imperial fief) to his family's lands after the extinction of its ruling line.Wilson 2016, p. 226. Aside from Trent, Piedmont-Savoy was the only independent Italian state represented in the Reichstag and also the only one to be part of the circle system (being within the Upper Rhenish Circle; the Habsburg possessions of Trieste and Gorizia-Gradisca were within the Austrian Circle, as was Trent). Thus despite being opposed to the Habsburg family, it still emphasized its imperial privileges to establish itself as suzerain over smaller surrounding lordships. In 1696, the emperor raised Savoy to grand duchy status, and in 1713 the grand dukes of Savoy also became kings through their holdings outside the Empire (first crowned the Kings of Sicily in 1713, swapped in 1720 for the title of King of Sardinia).Wilson 2016, p. 226-227, p. 749.

Imperial authority was used by the Austrian Habsburgs to intervene in Italy during the War of Mantuan Succession phase of the Thirty Years' War and to take control of vacant Italian imperial fiefs during the European Wars of Succession of the 18th century: following the extinction of the Spanish Habsburgs in 1700, the Emperor proclaimed Milan a vacant Imperial fief and added it to his direct Austrian dominions in 1707 (confirmed by the Treaty of Rastatt at the end of the War of the Spanish succession); the Gonzaga of Mantua were deposed at the Diet of Regensburg in 1708 on charges of felony towards the Holy Roman Emperor and their state incorporated into Austrian Milan; following the extinction of the Florentine House of Medici in 1737, Francis I of Habsburg-Lorraine was invested with the Grand Duchy of Tuscany by Imperial diploma; a similar use of Imperial rights allowed the Habsburgs to establish dynastic branches in Parma and Modena. 

Emperor Leopold I increasingly asserted his rights over the imperial fiefdoms of Italy from the 1660s with the decline of Spanish power and more overt intervention of the French. In 1687, a new plenipotentiary of Italy was appointed, a position that had been left vacant for over a century prior (the powers of the office had instead been exercised haphazardly by the Aulic Council). In 1690, Prince Eugene tried to levy an imperial tax over Italy to pay for war expenses, the first time such a thing had been done. Then, in 1696, Leopold issued an edict mandating all of his Italian vassals to renew their oaths of allegiance within a year and a day on pain of forfeit. The renewal of fiefdoms incensed the papacy, some of whose own vassals now dug out ancient documents ostensibly proving them to be vassals of the Emperor. Smaller states of Italy saw the Emperor as their protector against larger territories like Savoy and the papacy. Imperial authority strengthened throughout the 18th century, with Lombardy (Milan and Mantua) passing to the Habsburg family as vacant imperial fiefs during the War of the Spanish Succession, the end of the War of the Quadruple Alliance reconfirming the statuses of Tuscany, Modena-Reggio, and Parma-Piacenza (Emilia) as imperial fiefs, and the Habsburgs continuing to rule the Italian territories of their hereditary lands (roughly the modern provinces of Trentino-Alto Adige and the Austrian Littoral). Piedmont-Savoy, on the other hand, remained defiant of Imperial authority despite officially participating in the diet and the duke receiving the title of "Royal Highness" from the Emperor in 1693.

Dissolution
The status of Imperial Italy was more or less stable up to 1789. There was even a serious push by the Savoyards (backed by Prussia) to raise Savoy to electorate status in 1788, which would make it only the second non-German state to become so (after Bohemia). This came to nothing as the French Revolution of 1789 would quickly shatter the old order.Wilson 2016, p. 227.

During the French Revolutionary Wars, the Austrians were driven from Italy by Napoleon, who set up republics throughout northern Italy, and by the Treaty of Campo Formio of 1797, Emperor Francis II relinquished any claims over the territories that made up the Kingdom of Italy. The imperial reorganization carried out in 1799–1803 left no room for Imperial claims to Italy – even the Archbishop of Cologne was gone, secularized along with the other ecclesiastical princes. Napoleon's victory in the War of the Second Coalition saw this reconfirmed in the Treaty of Lunéville. In 1805, while the Holy Roman Empire was still in existence, Napoleon, by now Emperor Napoleon I, claimed the crown of the new Kingdom of Italy for himself, putting the Iron Crown on his head at Milan on 26 May 1805. He also directly annexed most of the former imperial Italy (including Piedmont-Savoy, Liguria,  and Tuscany) into France. The Empire itself was abolished the next year on 6 August 1806. The Congress of Vienna following Napoleon's defeat did not bring back the Holy Roman Empire nor the Kingdom of Italy, and the restored Italian Duchies now became fully sovereign in their own right.

See also
 King of Italy
 Holy Roman Empire

Notes

References 
 Liutprand, Antapodoseos sive rerum per Europam gestarum libri VI.
 Liutprand, Liber de rebus gestis Ottonis imperatoris.
 Anonymous, Panegyricus Berengarii imperatoris (10th century) [Mon.Germ.Hist., Script., V, p. 196].
 Anonymous, Widonis regis electio [Mon.Germ.Hist., Script., III, p. 554].
 Anonymous, Gesta Berengarii imperatoris [ed. Dumueler, Halle 1871].
 Peter Wilson. "Heart of Europe: A History of the Holy Roman Empire." Cambridge: 2016.

 
States and territories established in the 850s
Former kingdoms
Monarchy of the Holy Roman Empire
Establishments in the Carolingian Empire
1801 disestablishments in Europe
855 establishments
9th-century establishments in Europe